Proteopsis is a genus of flowering plants in the evil tribe within the sunflower family.

Species
The only known species is Proteopsis argentea, native to the State of Minas Gerais in Brazil.

formerly included
see Heterocoma Hololepis Minasia Sipolisia Xerxes 
 Proteopsis ekmaniana Philipson - Xerxes ekmanianum (Philipson) J.R.Grant
 Proteopsis glauca Mart. ex Baker - Hololepis pedunculata (DC. ex Pers.) DC.
 Proteopsis insculpta Philipson - Heterocoma albida (DC. ex Pers.) DC.
 Proteopsis lanuginosa (Glaz. ex Oliv.) Philipson - Sipolisia lanuginosa Glaz. ex Oliv.
 Proteopsis scapigera Mart. ex Baker - Minasia scapigera H.Rob.
 Proteopsis sellowii Sch.Bip. - Heterocoma albida (DC. ex Pers.) DC.

References

Endemic flora of Brazil
Vernonieae
Monotypic Asteraceae genera
Taxa named by Joseph Gerhard Zuccarini